Celal Sandal (12 March 1942, Kayseri – 12 December 2006, Ankara) was a Turkish welterweight boxer.

He participated in the 1968 Olympics, defeating Ghanaian Aaron Popoola and Bulgarian Ivan Kiriakov before losing to eventual East German champion Manfred Wolke. He competed in the Mediterranean Games twice, winning a silver medal in 1967 and a gold medal in 1971. He also won a bronze medal at the 1971 European Amateur Boxing Championships.

1968 Olympic results
Below is the record of Celal Sandal, a Turkish welterweight boxer who competed at the 1968 Mexico City Olympics:

 Round of 64: bye
 Round of 32: defeated Aaron Popoola (Ghana) by decision, 3-2
 Round of 16: defeated Ivan Kiriakov (Bulgaria) referee stopped contest
 Quarterfinal: lost to Manfred Wolke (East Germany) by decision, 1-4

References

Celal Sandal’ın ölümü üzüntü yarattı, Hürriyet 

1942 births
2006 deaths
Turkish male boxers
Boxers at the 1968 Summer Olympics
Olympic boxers of Turkey
Mediterranean Games silver medalists for Turkey
Mediterranean Games gold medalists for Turkey
Mediterranean Games medalists in boxing
Competitors at the 1967 Mediterranean Games
People from Kayseri
Welterweight boxers
Deaths from cancer in Turkey
20th-century Turkish people